Preiss is a Germanic surname, and may refer to:

 Ferdinand Preiss (1882–1943), German sculptor
 Balthazar Preiss (1765-1850), Austrian naturalist
 Ludwig Preiss (1811–1883), German naturalist
 Wolfgang Preiss (1910–2002), German actor
 Byron Preiss (1953–2005), U.S. publisher
 Henry Preiss, U.S. airplane designer
 Jeff Preiss, U.S. film-maker

See also 
 Preis, Preys
 Preuss
 Price

German-language surnames
Jewish surnames
German toponymic surnames
Ethnonymic surnames